Leptinotarsa is a genus of leaf beetles.

Several species in the genus produce leptinotarsin, a toxin similar to the diamphotoxin produced by species of the African leaf beetle genus Diamphidia. Some Leptinotarsa species are parasitised by ground beetles of genus Lebia.

Species

Leptinotarsa behrensi Harold, 1877
Leptinotarsa collinsi Wilcox, 1972
Leptinotarsa decemlineata Say, 1824 (Colorado potato beetle)
Leptinotarsa defecta Stål, 1859
Leptinotarsa dellacasai Daccordi & Zoia, 2017
Leptinotarsa gilberti Daccordi & Zoia, 2017
Leptinotarsa haldemani Rogers, 1856
Leptinotarsa heydeni
Leptinotarsa juncta (Germar, 1824) (false potato beetle)
Leptinotarsa lineolata Stål, 1863
Leptinotarsa mariachia Daccordi & Zoia, 2017
Leptinotarsa peninsularis Horn, 1894
Leptinotarsa rubiginosa Rogers, 1856
Leptinotarsa texana
Leptinotarsa tlascalana Stål, 1858
Leptinotarsa tumamoca Tower, 1918
Leptinotarsa typographica
Leptinotarsa undecimlineata

References

External links 

 Leptinotarsa at the Encyclopedia of Life. Retrieved 4 July 2013.

Chrysomelinae
Poisonous animals
Taxa named by Louis Alexandre Auguste Chevrolat
Chrysomelidae genera